The Royal Concert Hall may refer to:

Glasgow Royal Concert Hall
Nottingham Royal Concert Hall, part of the Royal Centre in Nottingham
Stockholm Concert Hall in Stockholm, Sweden

See also
Royal Hall (disambiguation)

Architectural disambiguation pages